Steenisia is a genus of flowering plants in the family Rubiaceae. The genus is endemic to the island of Borneo.

Species

Steenisia borneensis (Valeton) Bakh.f.
Steenisia corollina (Valeton) Bakh.f.
Steenisia elata (Valeton) Bakh.f.
Steenisia pleurocarpa (Airy Shaw) Bakh.f.
Steenisia pterosepala (Airy Shaw) Bakh.f.

References

External links
Steenisia in the World Checklist of Rubiaceae

Rubiaceae genera
Ixoroideae
Taxa named by Reinier Cornelis Bakhuizen van den Brink (born 1911)